Elliant is a commune in the Finistère department and administrative region of Brittany in north-western France.

Population
In French the inhabitants of Elliant are known as Elliantais.

See also
Communes of the Finistère department

References

External links

 

Mayors of Finistère Association 

Communes of Finistère